Bey is an Ottoman and Turkish term for a tribal chieftain and Islamic official; the leader of a beylik.

Bey or BEY may also refer to:

Places
 Bey, Ain, a commune in France
 Bey, Saône-et-Loire, a commune in France
 Bey-sur-Seille, a commune in the Meurthe-et-Moselle, France
 Bəyi or Bey, a village in Azerbaijan
 Beirut Rafic Hariri International Airport (IATA: BEY)

People
 Bey (surname)
 Queen Bey, a nickname for American singer Beyoncé

Other uses
 A nickname for the toy Beyblade
 Bond equivalent yield

See also 
 
 Bay (disambiguation)
 Bei (disambiguation)